Jemma Mary Siles (born 8 July 1997) is an Australian singer/songwriter, actress and dancer.
Winning Australian Pop Songwriter of the Year in 2018 and 2019 and Australian Ballad Songwriter of the Year in 2020 judged by APRA AMCOS. Siles has worked with and featured on a Nervo (DJs) and Wolfpack (DJs) track, "Like Air" which has over 3.5 million streams on Spotify alone. Recently she was a finalist in the Vanda and Young songwriting competition and semi-finalist in the International songwriting competition.

Early life
Siles was born in 1997 in Melbourne, Victoria. She has been singing since she was six years old and taught herself piano. She has been songwriting since she was 13. Siles attended a few performing arts schools and by the age of 8 she landed the title role in the musical Annie, singing hit songs "Tomorrow" as a solo artist and "I think i'm gonna like it here" alongside Australian-Italian soprano singer Giuseppina Grech at the National Theatre, Melbourne. She continued performing as a solo artist and alongside other artists in front of hundreds of people at festivals and competitions. Siles went on to audition for an elite performing arts company. Her attendance at Patrick Studios Australia allowed her to not only continue to perform in front of these large audiences but also train with professional performers from all over Australia who taught her skills including multiple dance styles, singing and acting.

She landed the role of Dance captain at her Performing Arts High School in 2015 after performing Lead in Godspell as Robin singing the hit song "day by day" in 2014.
Siles later had difficult personal battles to overcome which caused her to put a pause on her performance career until late 2016 to early 2017.

Career
Siles initially gained attention after posting a cover on Facebook of Anne-Marie and Clean Bandit's "Rockabye" in January 2017 which was reposted by the Facebook page Radio One (Lebanon) and reached over half a million views in just a few weeks. She later posted a multitude of videos and reached almost 200,000 views on her own post of "Symphony (Clean Bandit song)" by Zara Larsson and Clean Bandit. Siles then went onto work with DJs Olivia Nervo and Miriam Nervo on the track "Like Air" which was released in December 2017.
"Like air" reached over 1.8 million streams on Spotify alone by April 2018 and is played in major festivals all over the globe.

In May 2018, Siles released her debut single. "D.A.M.N." which takes influence from Taylor Swift, Tove Lo and George Maple while still maintaining her own artistry. Siles went on to win Australian Songwriter Of The Year 2018 (Contemporary/Pop Dance Category), judged by APRA AMCOS and presented by the ASA.

Late 2018 Siles supported Indiana Massara, Tayler Holder and Zach Clayton on their tour of Australia. Performing at 170 Russel in Melbourne, Royal on the Park Hotel in Brisbane and Astor Theatre in Perth.

Siles released her second single "Light Me Up" early 2019 and "out of my head" end of 2019.

Discography and accolades

Singles - As Lead Artist

Australian Songwriter of The Year Award

International Songwriting Competition 
The International Songwriting Competition (ISC) is an annual song contest for both aspiring and established songwriters. The judging panel is made up of musicians, songwriters and industry experts, and songs are judged on creativity, originality, lyrics, melody, arrangement and overall likeability

Vanda and Young Songwriting Competition 
The Vanda & Young Global Songwriting Competition is an annual competition that "acknowledges great songwriting whilst supporting and raising money for Nordoff-Robbins" and is coordinated by Albert Music and APRA AMCOS.

Singles - As Featured Artist

Personal awards

APRA AMCOS Professional Development Award

References

External links 

Living people
Australian women singer-songwriters
Australian pop singers
1997 births
21st-century Australian women singers